The Gimhae Kim clan is a Korean clan, descended from Suro of Geumgwan Gaya. King Suro was the founder of Gaya confederacy, and his descendant, Kim Yu-sin is renowned for leading the Silla armies unify the Three Kingdoms of Korea. It was considered a commoner surname.

More than six million present day Koreans, especially from Gimhae Kim, Heo and Lee (Yi) clans associate their Bon-gwan (geo-biological lineage roots) to Gimhae, in the South Gyeongsang Province of South Korea, and these clans place restrictions on marriage with each other due to the shared ancestors. Today, the Gimhae Kim clan is the largest clan group among them. The Gimhae Kim and Gimhae Heo clans, descend from the two sons of King Suro where the latter used their mother, Queen Heo Hwang-ok's surname, instead of their father's.

One of the dominant branch of Gimhae Kim clan is Samhyunpa-branch.

Origin 

The Gimhae Kim clan's founder, according to legend, was Kim Suro, whose wife was the legendary Queen Heo Hwang-ok.

Heo Hwang-ok bore 12 children. According to the Samguk Sagi, Kim Yu-sin was the 12th grandchild of Suro.

Notable People 
 Andrew Kim Taegon
 Kim Bo-kyem
 Kim Boo-kyum
 Kim Dae-jung
 Kim Hong-do
 Kim Hyong-uk
 Kim Ji-woo
 Kim Jong-dae
 Kim Jong-hyun
 Kim Jong-pil
 Kim Jong-woon
 Kim Kang-hoon
 Kim Min-seok
 Kim Moo-sung
 Kim Mu-ryeok
 Kim Ung-seo
 Kim Won-bong
 Kim Yu-sin

References 

Korean clans
Gimhae Kim clan